Pittsford is a town in Rutland County, Vermont, United States. As of the 2020 census, the town population was 2,862. Named for William Pitt, it has two picket forts used in the American Revolutionary War.

History
It is the location of two historical picket forts used by the militia during the American Revolutionary War: Fort Mott (built in 1777), and Fort Vengeance (built from 1780 to 1781), about a mile north.

The town of Pittsford, New York, was named by Colonel Caleb Hopkins after his hometown of Pittsford, Vermont, named after William Pitt.

Among the first settlers in Pittsford were the Cooley half-brothers, Benjamin Cooley III and Gideon Cooley. Gideon Cooley and Benjamin Cooley III were members of the Green Mountain Boys, and Benjamin was Captain under Col. Ethan Allen in the Revolutionary War and specifically the Capture of Fort Ticonderoga.

Geography
The unincorporated village of Pittsford is in the center of the town.

Demographics

As of the census of 2000, there were 3,140 people, 1,284 households, and 876 families residing in the town.  The population density was 72.2 people per square mile (27.9/km2).  There were 1,388 housing units at an average density of 31.9 per square mile (12.3/km2).  The racial makeup of the town was 99.08% White, 0.22% African American, 0.06% Native American, 0.19% Asian, and 0.45% from two or more races. Hispanic or Latino of any race were 0.41% of the population.

There were 1,284 households, out of which 29.7% had children under the age of 18 living with them, 56.2% were married couples living together, 8.3% had a female householder with no husband present, and 31.7% were non-families. 23.8% of all households were made up of individuals, and 9.3% had someone living alone who was 65 years of age or older.  The average household size was 2.44 and the average family size was 2.88.

In the town, the population was spread out, with 23.2% under the age of 18, 6.1% from 18 to 24, 30.0% from 25 to 44, 27.6% from 45 to 64, and 13.2% who were 65 years of age or older.  The median age was 40 years. For every 100 females, there were 99.9 males.  For every 100 females age 18 and over, there were 93.7 males.

The median income for a household in the town was $40,027, and the median income for a family was $44,079. Males had a median income of $34,769 versus $24,342 for females. The per capita income for the town was $19,271.  About 6.0% of families and 9.0% of the population were below the poverty line, including 9.4% of those under age 18 and 5.6% of those age 65 or over.

Notable people 

 George D. Chafee, Illinois lawyer and legislator
 Thomas E. Drew, former Adjutant General of the State of Vermont and resident of the village of Florence
 Frederic Williams Hopkins, Adjutant General of Vermont, 1837–1852
 Samuel Hopkins, holder of first American patent, for pearl and potash process (1790)
 Jake Lacy, actor (Casey in Better with You, Pete in "The Office"); grew up in Pittsford
 John Lowth, Wisconsin lawyer and legislator
Emma A. Winslow, home economist, researcher, writer

Sites of interest 

 Colburn Bridge
 Cooley Covered Bridge
 Depot Covered Bridge
 Fort Vengeance Monument Site
 Gorham Covered Bridge
 Hammond Covered Bridge
 Maclure Library
 Pittsford Green Historic District
 Thomas H. Palmer House

References

External links
 Town of Pittsford official website

 
Towns in Vermont
Towns in Rutland County, Vermont